The Yuriy Ivanov class (Project 18280) is a new type of Russian SIGINT intelligence collection ship. The ship is designed by the JSC Central Design Bureau Iceberg. The ship on its performance characteristics and capabilities is considerably superior to similar vessels of previous generations mainly due to the versatility and high level of automation and systems integration. The vessels of this class are designed for providing communication. The first ship, Yuriy Ivanov, was laid down in 2004 and was launched on 30 September 2013. The second ship, Ivan Khurs, was launched on 16 May 2017. Russia originally planned to build at least four such ships by 2020, but this date was later pushed back to 2025.

A new contract for medium intelligence ships (such as project 18280) was signed at Army 2021 forum, possibly for Yury Ivanov-class ships.

Ships

See also
 List of ships of the Russian Navy
 List of ships of Russia by project number

References 

Signals intelligence
Auxiliary surveillance ship classes
Auxiliary ships of the Russian Navy